The Faculty of Design, Technology and Communication, also known as IADE, and previously as the Institute of Visual Arts, Design and Marketing, and the Institute of Arts and Decoration, is a private university in Lisbon, Portugal, that operates as part of the European University of Lisbon. Its focused on design, arts, photography, marketing, advertising, technology, etc. It was established by António Quadros in 1969.

Notes

References 

Private universities and colleges in Portugal
Education in Lisbon
1969 establishments in Portugal